The Critical Language Scholarship (CLS) Program is a United States Department of State cultural and educational exchange program which offers approximately 600 undergraduate or graduate level students from the United States the opportunity to participate in an intensive language study abroad. This nationally competitive program funds students who study one of the 15 critical need foreign languages, and is part of the National Security Language Initiative. The 15 critical languages include Arabic, Azerbaijani, Bengali, Chinese, Hindi, Indonesian, Japanese, Korean, Persian, Portuguese, Punjabi, Russian, Swahili, Turkish and Urdu. With an acceptance rate of less than 10%, the Critical Language Scholarship is one of the most competitive scholarships in the U.S. and the most prestigious language program for U.S. citizens.

Program administration
The program is administered by American Councils for International Education with awards approved by the U.S. Department of State, Bureau of Educational and Cultural Affairs.

Eligibility requirements
Applicants to the program must be U.S. citizens enrolled in a U.S. degree-granting program at the undergraduate or graduate level at the time of application. Undergraduate students must have completed at least one year of general college course-work by the start date of the program. Other requirements are that the applicants should be in acceptable mental and physical health for which persons granted the scholarship are usually required to submit a satisfactory Medical Information Form and Physician’s Statement. The minimum age is 18 by the beginning of the CLS Program in the particular year.

The scholarship is open to students in all disciplines, including business, engineering, law, medicine, sciences, and humanities. There is also no discrimination on the basis of race, color, religion, national origin, gender, age, or disability in choosing awardees.

Language levels and prerequisites

Beginner
Offered at all levels (Beginning, Advanced Beginning, Intermediate and Advanced). No previous study of the language, or less than one academic year of study or the equivalent:
Azerbaijani
Bangla/Bengali
Hindi
Indonesian
Persian
Punjabi
Swahili
Turkish
Urdu

Intermediate
Requires at least one academic year of prior target language study or the equivalent (Advanced Beginning, Intermediate and Advanced):
Arabic
Korean
Portuguese
 Russian

Advanced 
Requires at least two academic years of prior target language study or the equivalent (Intermediate and Advanced only)
Chinese
Japanese

CLS Language Levels and Terminology 

 Beginning Level: No previous study of the language, or less than one academic year of study or the equivalent.
 Advanced Beginning Level: At least one academic year of target language study or the equivalent.
 Intermediate Level: At least two academic years of target language study or the equivalent.
 Advanced Level: At least three academic years of target language study or the equivalent.

The equivalent of 1 year of college-level language study entails but is not limited to: 1 summer of intensive language study, 2 semesters of study (audited or for credit), or 1 year of private tutoring. A typical academic year is 9 months (36 weeks). A typical language course is 3–5 hours per week or 108–180 hours per academic year of language instruction. Applicants who have completed the CLS Program may count each summer of participation as one year of language study. Applicants must choose to apply for only one language offered by the CLS Program.

Selection process
Award recipients will be selected on the basis of merit with consideration for: Academic record and potential to succeed in a rigorous academic setting; Ability to adapt to a different cultural environment; Diversity; Plan for continuation of study of the language; and Plan to use the language in future career. http://www.clscholarship.org/index.php?p=news/2015/sayyestocls
All applicants are initially read by two outside academic readers, and the top applications are reviewed by panels of academics and experts in the area and language.  Applicants recommended for selection are forwarded to the U.S. Department of State for final approval. After notification, selected participants will be required to complete a language evaluation. Selected applicants will be assigned to a CLS institute site by mid to late April based on language evaluation results along with information provided in the online application.

Program details 
The program begins with a two-day pre-departure orientation in Washington, D.C. Immediately following the orientation program, students are flown to their respective locations where they delve into the intensive language programs. The program itself involves approximately 20 hours a week of formal language instruction. In addition, CLS participants engage in a variety of language enhancement activities, including conversation partners, guest lectures, film viewings, host family visits (some sites), and cultural excursions. Some institutes require students to take a language pledge, which requires students to speak in the target language at designated times. Upon completing the program, students are asked to provide feedback and participate in post-program language testing.

Grant benefits
All CLS Program costs are covered for participants including: travel to and from the student's U.S. home city and program location, a mandatory Washington, D.C., pre-departure orientation, applicable visa fees, room, board, group-based intensive language instruction, program-sponsored travel within country, and all entrance fees for CLS Program cultural enhancement activities.

See also
National Security Education Program
National Security Language Initiative

References

Inline

General

External links
 Critical Language Scholarship Official Website
 American Councils for International Education Website
 U.S. Department of State; Bureau of Educational and Cultural Affairs Website
 Exchanges Connect

Language education in the United States
Bureau of Educational and Cultural Affairs